Schlans is a former municipality in the district of Surselva in the Swiss canton of Graubünden.  The municipality of Schlans merged on 1 January 2012 into the municipality of Trun.

History
Schlans is first mentioned in 765 as Selaunum.

Geography

Of this area, 43.9% is used for agricultural purposes, while 25.7% is forested. Of the rest of the land, 1.7% is settled (buildings or roads) and the remainder (28.7%) is non-productive (rivers, glaciers or mountains).

The municipality is located in the Disentis sub-district of the Surselva district on the heights above the Vorderrhein valley.  It consists of the village of Schlans.

Demographics
Schlans had a population (as of 2010) of 80.  , 2.3% of the population was made up of foreign nationals.  Over the last 10 years the population has decreased at a rate of -10%.  Most of the population speaks the Sursilvan dialect of Romansh(81.5%), with German being second most common (14.1%) and Spanish being third ( 3.3%).

, the gender distribution of the population was 46.7% male and 53.3% female.  The age distribution, in Schlans is; 15 children or 16.3% of the population are between 0 and 9 years old and 11 teenagers or 12.0% are between 10 and 19.  Of the adult population, 7 people or 7.6% of the population are between 20 and 29 years old.  13 people or 14.1% are between 30 and 39, 10 people or 10.9% are between 40 and 49, and 8 people or 8.7% are between 50 and 59.  The senior population distribution is 9 people or 9.8% of the population are between 60 and 69 years old, 12 people or 13.0% are between 70 and 79, there are 7 people or 7.6% who are between 80 and 89.

In the 2007 federal election the most popular party was the CVP which received 40.6% of the vote.  The next three most popular parties were the SVP (27.1%), the SP (25.2%) and the FDP (5.2%).

In Schlans about 56.7% of the population (between age 25-64) have completed either non-mandatory upper secondary education or additional higher education (either university or a Fachhochschule).

Schlans has an unemployment rate of 0.69%.  , there were 7 people employed in the primary economic sector and about 4 businesses involved in this sector.   No one is employed in the secondary sector.  4 people are employed in the tertiary sector, with 4 businesses in this sector.

The historical population is given in the following table:

References

External links

 Official website 
 

Trun, Switzerland
Former municipalities of Graubünden